"While Your Lover Sleeps" is a single by American country music artist Leon Ashley. The song peaked at number 25 on the Billboard Hot Country Singles chart. It also reached number 1 on the RPM Country Tracks chart in Canada.

Chart performance

References

1968 singles
Leon Ashley songs
1968 songs
Songs written by Margie Singleton
Songs written by Leon Ashley